Ibtihal Al-Khatib (born 15 February 1972) is a Kuwaiti academic, journalist, and prominent advocate of secular liberal values in Arab society. She is a professor at the Kuwait University in the department of English Language and Literature. She has been the subject of controversy because of her outspoken defense of secularism, separation of church and state, and civil rights, including gay rights.

References

Bibliography
Lichter, Ida (2009). Muslim Women Reformers: Inspiring Voices Against Oppression. Amherst (NY): Prometheus Books.

External links
 "Kuwaiti author Ibtihal al-Khatib: ISIS emerged from our heritage books; if we do not reform our discourse we will become extinct." MEMRI TV. Clip #5179. November 19, 2015. (Excerpt of Arabic tv interview (6:50), with English captions.)
 http://zizoumag.blogspot.com/2011/04/blog-post_9622.html
 http://www.alraimedia.com/Alrai/Article.aspx?id=184208
 http://www.ahewar.org/camp/i.asp?id=197
 http://enarchive.com/comments.php?m=865c0c0b4ab0e063e5caa3387c1a8741&id=15d3c71c50069c05c7b9099285a29e7b
 https://archive.today/20130223182942/http://www.alawan.org/%D8%A7%D8%A8%D8%AA%D9%87%D8%A7%D9%84-%D8%A7%D9%84%D8%AE%D8%B7%D9%8A%D8%A8-%D9%85%D8%A7.html

Kuwaiti women academics
Kuwaiti activists
Kuwaiti women activists
Kuwaiti women's rights activists
Living people
Kuwaiti people of Iranian descent
1972 births
Academic staff of Kuwait University
University of Colorado Boulder alumni